Travis Wammack (born November 1946 in Walnut, Mississippi, United States) is an American rock and roll guitarist from Memphis, Tennessee.

Described as an "instumental genius" and "a precursor to guitar-hero shreddding", he is known for his "magnificent guitar pyrotechnics", "hot and speedy guitar chops", and "wild guitar workouts" featuring early use of fuzztone and distortion. A child prodigy, Wammack's first record was released in 1957 when he was eleven years old, and at seventeen he hit the American charts with "Scratchy", an instrumental which peaked at #80 in 1964. He also charted briefly in 1966 at #128 with an instrumental version of "Louie Louie".

Wammack worked as a session guitarist at Sonic Recording Service and Hi Records in Memphis and at FAME Studios in Muscle Shoals, Alabama, in the 1960s. He released his first album, Travis Wammack, in 1972 and appeared on the charts with "Whatever Turns You On" (#95; written by George Jackson and Raymond Moore) and "How Can I Tell You" (#68; written by Cat Stevens).  In 1975 he released his second album, Not For Sale, which generated two additional hits: "Easy Evil" (#72; written by Alan O'Day), and "(Shu-Doo-Pa-Poo-Poop) Love Being Your Fool" (#38; written by Jerry Williams, Jr. and Charlie Whitehead).

He was Little Richard's band leader from 1984 until 1995. He wrote "Greenwood, Mississippi" which Richard recorded in 1970, featuring Wammack on lead guitar. In 1988, Richard recorded Wammack's "(There's) No Place Like Home", planned as a new single, but shelved. Live versions were included on Giants of Rock and Roll, an Australian DVD of a 1989 concert, and on compilations Live in Europe 1993 and The Quasar of Rock.

Still performing, Travis now works with Muscle Shoals Music Marketing, and has added record producer to his resume. In 1999 Wammack received the Professional Musician Award from the Alabama Music Hall of Fame, and in 2005 was inducted into The Southern Legends Entertainment & Performing Arts Hall of Fame.  In May 2006, Gibson Guitars presented Travis with a new Gibson ES-335 guitar as part of their documentary honoring legendary Gibson ES series players. In 2011, he was recognized by the Rockabilly Hall of Fame as a rockabilly "legend".

Wammack performed with Billy Lee Riley and with Sonny Burgess and the Legendary Pacers at Newport, Arkansas's annual Depot Days Festival on September 27, 2008.  On August 30, 2009 at the Silver Moon in Newport, Arkansas, he again played with Sonny Burgess and the Legendary Pacers, and with other bands, at the Billy Lee Riley benefit concert. Wammack continues to perform live at the Depot Days Festival and other venues.

Discography

Albums
Travis Wammack (Fame Records, 1972)
Not For Sale (Capricorn, 1975)
A Man...and a Guitar (Phonorama, 1982)
Follow Me (Phonorama, 1982)
Still Rockin (Snakeman Records, 1998)
Snake, Rattle & Roll in Muscle Shoals (Snakeman Records, 2000)
Rock-N-Roll Party (Travis Wammack, 2002)
Scratchy (Travis Wammack, 2006)
The Psychedelic Years - Live (Travis Wammack, 2006)
Memphis + Muscle Shoals = Travis Wammack (Travis Wammack, 2008)
Almost Home (Travis Wammack, 2008)
Country In My Soul (Muscle Shoals, 2009)
Shotgun Woman (Monaco, 2010)
Rock-N-Roll Days (Travis Wammack, 2010)
Rock-N-Roll Days Vol. II (Travis Wammack, 2011)
Blues, Soul & Rock-N-Roll (Travis Wammack, ?)

Compilations
That Scratchy Guitar from Memphis (Bear Family Records, 1987)
Scr-Scr-Scratchy! (Zu Zazz Records, 2000)

References

External links
Official Website
[ Travis Wammack] at Allmusic.com
Comprehensive discography
 
Travis Wammack's Rock and Roll Days: A Musical Journey from Memphis to Muscle Shoals at Google Books

1946 births
Living people
People from Tippah County, Mississippi
American rock guitarists
American male guitarists
American session musicians
Musicians from Memphis, Tennessee
Guitarists from Tennessee
20th-century American guitarists
20th-century American male musicians